Victor Gérard Farvacques (or Farvacque; 30 September 1902 – 25 April 1940) was a French footballer who played as a left winger.

Career 
Farvacques played for US Tourcoing and he made his first and only appearance for the France football team on the 21 February 1928 in a friendly match in Paris against Ireland. France won 4–0.

During World War II, he served in the 310th Infantry Regiment and died in battle at Gravelines in 1940.

References 

1902 births
1940 deaths
Sportspeople from Tourcoing
French footballers
Association football wingers
US Tourcoing FC players
French military personnel killed in World War II
France international footballers
French Army personnel of World War II
Footballers from Hauts-de-France
20th-century French people